Nothing Can Stop Us may refer to:

 Nothing Can Stop Us (album), by Robert Wyatt
 "Nothing Can Stop Us" (song), by Saint Etienne

See also
 "Nothing's Gonna Stop Us", a song by British rock band, The Darkness
 "Nothing's Gonna Stop Us Now", a song recorded by the American rock band Starship in 1986